ShutdownDC is an activist organization in the Washington metropolitan area. ShutdownDC formed originally in 2019 as a coalition of climate activists concerned with the climate crisis, aiming to snarl traffic in the city to demand action on the Green New Deal, and other climate-related issues. Since then, ShutdownDC has expanded their scope to advocacy via non-violent direct action on issues as diverse as abortion rights, the International Monetary Fund and World Bank's treatment of the Global South, and abolishing the filibuster.

History 
ShutdownDC formed in 2019 as a coalition of climate activists with the goal of disrupting traffic across Washington, D.C. to demand solutions to the climate crisis. They were supported by groups such as Code Pink, the DC chapter of the Democratic Socialists of America, Rising Tide North America, the DMV hub of the Black Lives Matter Global Network, the DC hub of the Sunrise Movement, the DC chapter of Extinction Rebellion, the Chesapeake Climate Action Network, Beyond Extreme Energy, Werk For Peace, the DC chapter of 350.org, Backbone Campaign, the Friends Meeting in Washington Social Concerns Committee, and the Labor Network for Sustainability. The coalition successfully slowed traffic across the city, blockading 22 intersections, with 32 participants arrested.

Activities 
Despite its initial formation as a temporary organizing structure, ShutdownDC continued to participate in climate protests as an affinity group in the months following its initial action, maturing into an organization of its own. ShutdownDC, since then, has convened a variety of cross-movement coalitions around various mobilizations. As the COVID-19 pandemic struck, its focus began to broaden, and the organization undertook a week of action around International Workers' Day aiming to highlight how the pandemic had exacerbated inequality. This included a bike protest in support of essential workers, the painting of a large street mural outside the DC home of Jeff Bezos in support of Amazon workers, and a protest on bike and car in support of striking workers, among other causes.

ShutdownDC played a role in the George Floyd protests in Washington, D.C., including organizing a protest in Lafayette Square, a large protest at the home of then Acting United States Department of Homeland Security Secretary Chad Wolf in Alexandria, Virginia relating to his role in 2020 deployment of federal forces in the United States, and protests during then President Donald Trump's speech to the 2020 Republican National Convention.

ShutdownDC, in the run-up to the 2020 United States presidential election, began to organize around democracy issues, including large protests outside the home of US Postmaster General Louis DeJoy who faced allegations of slowing postal service and voter suppression. ShutdownDC began to plan actions and meet relating to the possibility of attempts to overturn the 2020 United States presidential election should Joe Biden win and Donald Trump deny the outcome. ShutdownDC planned a week of action starting on election day to "defend democracy" via direct action, including a large event with live performers on election night in Black Lives Matter Plaza and escalating actions should Donald Trump indeed deny the results of the election. The group stated they believed that “Trump will not leave office without mass mobilization and direct action.” ShutdownDC lead efforts to pressure hotels to enforce COVID-19 restrictions on those coming to the city to protest against Joe Biden's victory, and for the revocation of the liquor license for Harry's Bar, which had been fined for COVID-19 restriction violations relating to crowds of maskless supporters of Donald Trump in the venue after election-related protests. Amidst this, the group continued to take action relating to inequality and the COVID-19 pandemic, including by dropping body bags in front of the homes of prominent Republican Senators to demand COVID-19 relief legislation. As efforts to overturn the 2020 United States presidential election accelerated, ShutdownDC hosted a vigil outside of the Vienna, Virginia home of Missouri Senator Josh Hawley. Protestors sang songs, told stories, and delivered a copy of the Constitution of the United States to his doorstep. Hawley called ShutdownDC "antifa scumbags" in a Twitter thread about the protest, claiming protests were violent, countering the descriptions of local police who described the protestors as peaceful. ShutdownDC additionally ran a successful pressure campaign to cancel all Airbnb bookings in DC in the days around the inauguration of Joe Biden, fearing right-wing violence in the wake of the January 6 United States Capitol attack.

In October 2021, ShutdownDC led a 25-hour-long protest outside Kentucky Senator Mitch McConnell's home to press for abolishing the filibuster. Shortly before the one-year anniversary of the January 6 attack, the group hung a banner demanding Congress "expel all fascists".

ShutdownDC has been an active participant in the 2022 abortion protests. In 2021, when the Supreme Court of the United States declined to block a law restricting abortion in Texas, ShutdownDC led a protest for abortion rights in front of the Chevy Chase, Maryland home of Justice Brett Kavanaugh, a form of protest which soon became a regular affair for conservative Justices. In the wake of the leaked potential decision inDobbs v. Jackson Women's Health Organization, ShutdownDC organized large-scale street blockades in the areas around the Supreme Court of the United States. Florida Governor Ron DeSantis called the peaceful blockades an insurrection on Fox & Friends. Protestors with ShutdownDC went on to attempt to confront Brett Kavanaugh at a DC location of Morton's The Steakhouse, where he was dining, for his role in Dobbs v. Jackson Women's Health Organization, forcing Kavanaugh to leave via a backdoor. The protest was defended by political figures such as Transportation Secretary Pete Buttigieg, who called it an exercise in "free speech", and US Congresswoman Alexandria Ocasio-Cortez, who tweeted "Poor guy. He left before his soufflé because he decided half the country should risk death if they have an ectopic pregnancy within the wrong state lines. It’s all very unfair to him". The group later offered DC-area service workers up to $250 for sightings of Supreme Court Justices Brett Kavanaugh, Samuel Alito, Clarence Thomas, Neil Gorsuch, Amy Coney Barrett, and John Roberts in a viral tweet. In December 2022, ShutdownDC activists disrupted a banquet held to benefit the Capitol Hill Pregnancy Center, a crisis pregnancy center at a Marriott in Crystal City, Arlington, Virginia, claiming the clinic "lies to patients, endangers pregnant people, and is part of a national anti-abortion network".

ShutdownDC led a protest opposing the Line 3 pipeline at the home of White House Chief of Staff Ron Klain; 23 people were arrested by the Montgomery County Police Department. In December 2021, ShutdownDC helped organize another coalition of organizations to engage in a large blockade of traffic in Washington, D.C. centered around supporting the Build Back Better Act, which included significant climate action, as well as other progressive legislative priorities. Traffic was snarled around the United States Capitol, and the United States Capitol Police arrested 38. There were about 150 participants. ShutdownDC organized a smaller-scale blockade the following month around the White House with similar goals. In October 2022, ShutdownDC organized a coalition of organizations for a week of actions, including street marches and a bike blockade, surrounding the annual meetings of the IMF and World Bank, under the banner "For People, For Planet: Decarbonize & Decolonize". Demands included an end to fossil fuel investment by the institutions, as well as the canceling of debts held by countries in the Global South.

Criticism 
ShutdownDC has been critiqued by many members of the Republican Party, as well as by venues where ShutdownDC protests have taken place, both due to ideological opposition to ShutdownDC and on the basis of the tactics ShutdownDC organizes with. Senator Josh Hawley referred to the group as "antifa scumbags" in a tweet in the wake of a protest outside of his Virginia home, which brought media attention to the group. In the run-up to ShutdownDC's street blockades surrounding the U.S. Supreme Court, Florida Governor Ron DeSantis accused ShutdownDC of plotting an insurrection on Fox & Friends. In the wake of their disruption of Justice Brett Kavanaugh's dinner at Morton's The Steakhouse, the restaurant released a statement slamming the group, stating that "Politics, regardless of your side or views, should not trample the freedom at play of the right to congregate and eat dinner." and that "Disturbing the dinner of all of our customers was an act of selfishness and void of decency." An editorial writer for Deseret News, the mouthpiece of the The Church of Jesus Christ of Latter-day Saints, critiqued the group as promoting "mob rule" with its protests of Supreme Court Justices. Following disruptions of an annual banquet for the Capitol Hill Pregnancy Center, a crisis pregnancy center, Josh Hawley again commented on Twitter in reference to ShutdownDC, "Hahahah. These people are such losers." The Heritage Foundation, a prominent conservative think tank, called the protest on Twitter "gross".

References

External links 

 

2019 establishments in Washington, D.C.
Organizations established in 2019
Environmental protests in the United States
Climate change protests
Direct action